Stanton Airfield  is a public use airport located one nautical mile (1.85 km) east of the central business district of Stanton, in Goodhue County, Minnesota, United States. The airport is privately owned by Stanton Sport Aviation, Inc.

History 
Carleton Airport has been in operation since 1942, when Carleton College bought a farm to use as an airport to train pilots for World War II. In 1944, the college leased the field to Triangle Aviation, operated by Malcolm and Margaret Manuel, which eventually bought the airport in 1955. In 1990, Stanton Sport Aviation was formed to purchase the airport. The airport was added to the National Register of Historic Places in 2004.

Facilities and aircraft 
It has two runways with turf surfaces: 9/27 is 1,970 by 180 feet (600 x 55 m) and 18/36 is 2,550 by 200 feet (777 x 61 m).

For the 12-month period ending August 31, 2007, the airport had 15,000 general aviation aircraft operations, an average of 41 per day. At that time there were 47 aircraft based at this airport: 36% single-engine and 64% glider.

References

External links 
 Stanton Airfield
 Aerial photo as of 17 April 1991 from USGS The National Map via MSR Maps
 

Airports in Minnesota
Transportation in Goodhue County, Minnesota
Buildings and structures in Goodhue County, Minnesota
Airports on the National Register of Historic Places
Transportation buildings and structures on the National Register of Historic Places in Minnesota
World War II on the National Register of Historic Places
National Register of Historic Places in Goodhue County, Minnesota
1942 establishments in Minnesota